Ian Flanagan (born 15 January 1982) is a Welsh former professional tennis player.

Biography 
Flanagan grew up in the village of Graianrhyd, and attended Ysgol Brynhyfryd between 1993 and 1997.

At the age of four, he attended a tennis fun-day with his brother.  This sparked an interest that culminated in him, at the age of 15, being the top junior tennis player in the world and Youth Olympics gold medalist in 1996.  Unfortunately, a severe bout of glandular fever between 1998 and 2000 threatened to end his promising career.  However, despite his illness, and despite being the only senior British tennis player not funded by the LTA (something he is harshly critical of), Flanagan fought back.

In 2004, Flanagan staged a shock upset when he beat Mark Philippoussis 7–6, 7–6, in the opening round of the Stella Artois Championship at Queen's Club.  Despite also beating the world no. 35, Victor Hănescu, in the second round of the tournament, before succumbing to Sébastien Grosjean in the last 16, Flanagan was denied a wildcard into Wimbledon. The victory raised his profile, and put him on a tennis players' special Weakest Link.

External links

References

1982 births
Living people
Welsh male tennis players
Sportspeople from Denbighshire
British male tennis players